Brownsea Open Air Theatre (commonly abbreviated BOAT) is an open-air Shakespearian theatre company based in Poole, Dorset that have performed large theatrical productions since 1964. Annually performing a play from the extensive works of William Shakespeare for three weeks in July and August, the production is set on the National Trust's Brownsea Island in Poole Harbour with boats transporting patrons to the island from  Poole Quay.

Proceeds from the production are donated to The National Trust for whom BOAT have so far raised over £250,000.

In 2013 their 50th Season was celebrated with A Midsummer Night's Dream and Pericles, followed in 2014 by Henry IV, part 1 and Henry IV, part 2 (combined into a single production), More recent productions include The Tempest, The Two Gentlemen Of Verona, As You Like It , Titus Andronicus and Richard III.

For a single season in 2006/7 BOAT Ashore was established when the company's committee agreed that a modern adaptation of Romeo and Juliet (in Shakespeare's original words) could be produced under the BOAT banner on the mainland. The production ran in early 2007 throughout Dorset.

BOAT. were part of the Royal Shakespeare Company'''s Open Stages project in 2012, participating in workshops and performing an excerpt from their 2011 production of Julius Caesar . They took part in Open Stages 2014 with a combined version of Henry IV, part 1 and Henry IV, part 2, one scene of which they performed at the Royal Shakespeare Theatre in Stratford Upon AvonDue to the covid-19 pandemic, no performances took place in 2020 or 2021. Instead, BOAT launched "BOAT at HOME" which included filmed scenes from Shakespeare's plays as well as full length videos of past productions, broadcast on YouTube.

In 2022 BOAT joined forces with the newly formed Extraordinary Theatre Company to take a touring production of King Lear to venues in Dorset and Hampshire including Forest Forge and Bournemouth Little Theatre. The aim was to bring an accessible production to audiences new to Shakespeare.

In 2023 BOAT celebrate their 60th Season with Romeo and Juliet.

Critical acclaim
BOAT receive excellent national and regional coverage, and have been featured in The Guardian as one of the UK's Top 10 Open Air Theatre Venues, listed second to the Minack Theatre in Porthcurno, Cornwall.

In 2009 BOAT was included in Debrett's list of the top five things to do in England and in 2019 Woman's Weekly featured BOAT as one of the Top 5 Open Air Theatres in the UK.

Productions

In 2023 BOAT are staging Romeo and Juliet, with Macbeth planned for 2024. 

Former BOAT members
Former members of Brownsea Open Air Theatre who went on to appear in film, stage and/or television include the following:
Christopher Mellows, an actor in Silent Witness, Midsomer Murders and Foyle's War.
Rebecca Night, played the title role in the BBC adaptation of Fanny Hill, broadcast in October 2007.
Lisa Dillon, best known as Mary Smith in Cranford on BBC One and has starred in productions for the RSC, National Theatre'' and in the West End

References

External links
Official website

Outdoor theatres
Theatres in Dorset
Poole